Doris (minor planet designation: 48 Doris) is one of the largest main belt asteroids. It was discovered on 19 September 1857 by Hermann Goldschmidt from his balcony in Paris.

Name
To find a name for the object, Jacques Babinet of the Academy of Sciences created a shortlist and asked the geologist Élie de Beaumont to make the selection. De Beaumont chose Doris, after an Oceanid in Greek mythology. Since Doris was discovered on the same night as 49 Pales, de Deaumont suggested naming the two "The Twins".

Physical characteristics
An occultation on 19 March 1981 suggested a diameter of 219±25 km.  Observations of an occultation on 14 October 1999, using four well-placed chords, indicate an ellipsoid of 278×142 km and that 48 Doris is an extremely irregularly shaped object.

Conjunction
Doris will pass within 0.019 AU of Pallas in June 2132.

In popular culture 
48 Doris is a location in the text-based science fiction game Federation 2.

Notes

References

External links 
 
 

Background asteroids
Doris
Doris
CG-type asteroids (Tholen)
Ch-type asteroids (SMASS)
18570919
Objects observed by stellar occultation